Alaton is a surname. Notable people with the surname include:

İshak Alaton (1927–2016), Turkish businessman and investor of Jewish descent
Kalef Alaton (1940–1989), Turkish interior designer
Leyla Alaton (born 1961), Turkish businesswoman and art collector

See also
Alton (surname)